Common name: Totonacan rattlesnake

Crotalus totonacus is a venomous pit viper species found in northeastern Mexico. No subspecies are currently recognized.

Description
 

Geographic range
It is found in northeastern Mexico from central Nuevo León through southern Tamaulipas, northern Veracruz, eastern San Luis Potosí and northern Querétaro.

Diet 
Crotalus totonacus is known to prey on small mammals and birds. In addition to mammal hair and bird feathers found in stomachs, specific prey items include cave rats (Neotoma sp.), Allen’s tree squirrels (Sciurus alleni), and rock squirrels (Spermophilus [Otospermophilus] variegatus).

Taxonomy
This species was previously considered a subspecies of C. durissus.

References

Further reading
 Gloyd, H.K. and C.F. Kauffeld. 1940. A new rattlesnake from Mexico. Bull. Chicago Acad. Sci. 6 (2): 11-14 + one plate.

totonacus
Reptiles described in 1940